Christine Grady is an American nurse and bioethicist who serves as the head of the Department of Bioethics at the National Institutes of Health Clinical Center.

Early life and education 
Grady was born and raised in Livingston, New Jersey. Her father, John H. Grady Jr., was a Yale University graduate and United States Navy veteran who served as the mayor of Livingston. Her mother, Barbara, was an assistant dean at Seton Hall University School of Law.

Grady graduated from Livingston High School, after which she earned a BS in nursing and biology from Georgetown University in 1974, a Master of Science in Nursing from Boston College in 1978, and a PhD in philosophy from Georgetown University in 1993.

Career
Grady has worked in nursing, clinical research, and clinical care, with a specialization in HIV. She was a Commissioner on the Presidential Commission for the Study of Bioethical Issues from 2010 and 2017.

Grady is a member of the National Academy of Medicine, a senior fellow at the Kennedy Institute of Ethics, and a fellow of The Hastings Center and American Academy of Nursing. She received the National Institutes of Health CEO Award in 2017 and the Director's Award from the same organization in 2015 and 2017.

Personal life
Grady is married to Anthony Fauci, an American immunologist and former head of the National Institute of Allergy and Infectious Diseases (NIAID) at the National Institutes of Health. They have three daughters.

References

Further reading

External links

Living people
American medical researchers
Connell School of Nursing alumni
Georgetown University Graduate School of Arts and Sciences alumni
HIV/AIDS researchers
National Institutes of Health people
American women nurses
Fellows of the American Academy of Nursing
Members of the National Academy of Medicine
Bioethicists
20th-century American scientists
21st-century American scientists
20th-century American women scientists
21st-century American women scientists
Nursing researchers
Livingston High School (New Jersey) alumni
People from Livingston, New Jersey
Year of birth missing (living people)
American nurses
Scientists from New Jersey
Georgetown University School of Nursing alumni